Ricaurte may refer to:

People
Antonio Ricaurte, Colombian revolutionary
Andrés Ricaurte, Colombian footballer

Places
Ricaurte Province, Boyacá
Ricaurte, Cundinamarca, Colombia
Ricaurte, Nariño, Colombia
Ricaurte, TransMilenio station
Ricaurte Municipality, Venezuela